Estelí is a department of Nicaragua. It covers an area of 2,230 km2 and has a population of 230,953 (2021 estimate). Its capital is the city of Estelí.

Municipalities 

 Condega
 Estelí
 La Trinidad
 Pueblo Nuevo
 San Juan de Limay
 San Nicolás

References

External links
 Mapa del Departamento de Estelí
 Portal del Norte de Nicaragua
 Portal de Estelí Nicaragua 

 
Departments of Nicaragua